Ethel Lynn may refer to the following persons who may be commonly known as such:

 Ethel Grace Lynn
 Ethel Lynn Beers